Carmenza Delgado Castillo (born May 5, 1972 in Cartago, Valle del Cauca) is a retired weightlifter from Colombia. She twice competed for her native South American country at the Summer Olympics (2000 and 2004), finishing in fourth and ninth place. Delgado twice won a medal in the women's super-heavyweight division (+ 75 kg) at the Pan American Games.

External links

 
 

1972 births
Living people
Sportspeople from Valle del Cauca Department
Olympic weightlifters of Colombia
Weightlifters at the 1999 Pan American Games
Weightlifters at the 2003 Pan American Games
Weightlifters at the 2000 Summer Olympics
Weightlifters at the 2004 Summer Olympics
Colombian female weightlifters
Pan American Games gold medalists for Colombia
Pan American Games bronze medalists for Colombia
Pan American Games medalists in weightlifting
Central American and Caribbean Games gold medalists for Colombia
Competitors at the 2006 Central American and Caribbean Games
Central American and Caribbean Games medalists in weightlifting
Medalists at the 1999 Pan American Games
Medalists at the 2003 Pan American Games
20th-century Colombian women
21st-century Colombian women